This is a complete list of members of the United States House of Representatives during the 112th United States Congress (January 3, 2011 – January 3, 2013) in order of seniority. For the most part, representatives are ranked by the beginning of their terms in office. Representatives whose terms begin the same day are ranked by seniority.

Note: The "*" indicates that the representative/delegate may have served one or more non-consecutive terms while in the House of Representatives of the United States Congress.

U.S. House seniority list

Delegates

See also
112th United States Congress
List of United States congressional districts
List of United States senators in the 112th Congress by seniority

Notes

External links
 Current seniority list

Seniority
112